The 2017–18 Djibouti Premier League was the 30th season of the Djibouti Premier League, the top-tier football league in Djibouti. The season started on 20 October 2017.

Djibouti Télécom won the league.

Standings

See also
2018 Djibouti Cup

References

Football leagues in Djibouti
Premier League
Premier League
Djibouti